The Roman Catholic Diocese of Bareilly is a diocese located in the city of Bareilly in the Ecclesiastical province of Agra in India.

History
 19 January 1989: Established as Diocese of Bareilly from the Diocese of Lucknow.

Leadership
 Bishops of Bareilly (Latin Rite)
 Bishop Anthony Fernandes (19 January 1989 – 3 October 2014)
Bishop Ignatius D’Souza (4 October 2014 – present)

References

External links
 GCatholic.org 
 Catholic Hierarchy 
  Diocese website 

Roman Catholic dioceses in India
Christian organizations established in 1989
Christianity in Uttar Pradesh
Bareilly
Roman Catholic dioceses and prelatures established in the 20th century
1989 establishments in Uttar Pradesh